The Portugal Billie Jean King Cup team represents Portugal in the Billie Jean King Cup tennis competition and are governed by the Federação Portuguesa de Ténis.  They competed in the Europe/Africa Zone of Group II in 2011, but were promoted to Group I for 2012.

History
Portugal competed in its first Fed Cup in 1968.  Their best result was finishing fifth overall in the Europe/Africa Zone Group I in 2012.

Players

External links
 

Billie Jean King Cup teams
Fed Cup
T